Joël Bruneau (born 7 September 1963) is a French politician, mayor of Caen since 2014. He was reelected in 2020.

Distinctions
 Chevalier of the Légion d'honneur.

See also
 List of mayors of Caen

References

1963 births
Living people
University of Tours alumni
Sciences Po alumni
Mayors of Caen
The Republicans (France) politicians
Politicians from Centre-Val de Loire
Chevaliers of the Légion d'honneur
People from Châteauroux